Nathaniel Lees is a New Zealand theatre actor and director and film actor of Samoan descent, best known for film roles in The Matrix Reloaded, The Matrix Revolutions and The Lord of the Rings: The Two Towers and for starring in Young Hercules as Chiron the centaur.

Acting career
Lees was born in Auckland, New Zealand. He was brought up in an environment where Samoan was commonly spoken, so he grew up thinking of himself as being Samoan. He got his first acting job because of "being brown", as the theatre required brown people running around on stage killing Captain Cook. Part of the audition was him walking through the door, and upon doing so, he "had the job". 

He is known for his role as Captain Mifune in The Matrix trilogy and his role as "Uglúk" in The Lord of the Rings: The Two Towers. He has also had roles on the TV series Young Hercules, Hercules: The Legendary Journeys and Xena: Warrior Princess. He appeared in 30 Days of Night with Josh Hartnett.  He also played Master Mao in the Power Rangers series Power Rangers Jungle Fury. Early television appearances in New Zealand included a regular role in the 1989 series Shark in the Park.

He is also well known for a long career in theatre, having received many prestigious rewards for his contribution to the arts. Lees was one of the influential actors that paved the way for Pacific theatre in New Zealand. In 2004 he was awarded the Senior Pacific Artist Award at the Creative New Zealand Arts Pasifika Awards.

Theatre director
Lees was the director of the award winning play Think of a Garden written by John Kneubuhl, performed at the Watershed Theatre in 1993  in Auckland and then again in 1995 produced by Cath Cardiff and performed at Taki Rua Theatre in Wellington 1995. At the prestigious Chapman Tripp Theatre Awards 1995, the play won Production of the Year and Lees was awarded Director of the Year. In 1996, he directed A Frigate Bird Sings co-written by Oscar Kightley and Dave Fane and produced by Makerita Urale for the New Zealand International Festival of the Arts. The set was designed by Kate Peters and Michel Tuffery. The play was nominated for Production of the Year, Director of the Year, and Set Design at the 1996 Chapman Tripp Theatre Awards. In 2003, Lees directed The Songmaker's Chair by Albert Wendt. He also directed Awhi Tapu, by Māori playwright Albert Belz.

Filmography
Other Halves (1984) – Court Clerk
Death Warmed Up (1984) – Jackson
Shaker Run (1985) – Squad Commander
Chill Factor (1989) – Charles
Rapa-Nui (1994) – Long Ear Chief
Bonjour Timothy (1995) – Mr. Wiley
The Other Side of Heaven (2001) – Kelepi
The Lost World (2001, TV Movie) – Indian chief
The Lord of the Rings: The Two Towers (2002) – Uglúk
The Matrix Reloaded (2003) – Mifune
Liquid Bridge (2003) – Ogitani
The Matrix Revolutions (2003) – Mifune
No. 2 (2006) – Uncle John
Sione's Wedding (2006) – Minister
The Tattooist (2007) – Mr. Perenese
30 Days of Night (2007) – Carter Davies
Power Rangers Jungle Fury (2008, TV Series) – Master Mao
Journey to Ihipa (2008)
Under the Mountain (2009) – Detective Gray
Sione's 2: Unfinished Business (2012) – Minister
Mr. Pip (2012) – Mr. Jaggers
Realiti (2014) – George
One Thousand Ropes (2016) – Henry Pasi
Everybody Else Is Taken (2016, Short) – Geoffrey
Mortal Engines (2018)
The Other Side of Heaven II: Fire of Faith (2019) – Kelepi
The Dead Lands (2020, TV Series) – Te Kaipō

References

External links

New Zealand male film actors
New Zealand male television actors
Living people
People from Auckland
New Zealand people of Samoan descent
21st-century New Zealand male actors
Actors of Samoan descent
1972 births